Andrew Aaron Sorensen (July 20, 1938 – April 17, 2011) was an American academic administrator. He served as the president of the University of Alabama and the University of South Carolina. He later worked as senior vice president for development and special assistant to the president for advancement at Ohio State University.

References

1938 births
2011 deaths
People from Pittsburgh
Presidents of the University of Alabama
Presidents of the University of South Carolina
University of Illinois alumni
University of Michigan School of Public Health alumni 
Yale University alumni